Arakimentari  is a 2004 American film directed by Travis Klose. It is a documentary film about acclaimed and controversial Japanese photographer Nobuyoshi Araki. The film looks at Araki's personal life as well as his art.

Cast
 Nobuyoshi Araki as himself
 Björk as herself
 Richard Kern as himself
 Takeshi Kitano as himself

External links
 
 

Reviews
 Review of Arakimentari at Channel 4 Film
 Review of UK Region 0 DVD at Digital Lard

2004 films
American documentary films
Japanese art
Documentary films about photographers
Documentary films about Japan
2004 documentary films
2000s English-language films
2000s American films